RetroUI is a utility for Windows 8 (applies to the Pro edition) and Windows Server 2012 (the Server edition) by Thinix that modifies Windows Shell, especially the Start menu and taskbar.  RetroUI places a Start menu and start button on the Windows taskbar, makes taskbar visible on the Start screen, and allows users to run Windows Store apps in re-sizable windows. RetroUI was launched in September 2012.

See also
 Comparison of Start menu replacements for Windows 8

References

External links
 

Windows-only software